This is a list of Norwegian television related events from 2011.

Events
27 May - 14-year-old dancer Daniel J. Elmrhari wins the fourth series of Norske Talenter.
13 November - Singer and runner up of the second series of X Factor Atle Pettersen and his partner Marianne Sandaker win the seventh series of Skal vi danse?
4 December - Tine Barstad wins the fourth series of Big Brother Norway.
16 December - Jenny Langlo wins the sixth series of Idol.

Debuts
30 August - Idol (2003-2007, 2011–present)

Television shows

2000s
Skal vi danse? (2006–present)
Norske Talenter (2008–present)

Ending this year

Births

Deaths

See also
2011 in Norway